Jerry Obiang (born 10 June 1992 in Libreville) is a Gabonese professional footballer. He plays for Gabon national football team. He has competed at the 2012 Summer Olympics.

References

1992 births
Living people
Gabonese footballers
Olympic footballers of Gabon
Footballers at the 2012 Summer Olympics
Association football midfielders
21st-century Gabonese people